The Abzu or Apsu, also called  (Cuneiform:, ;; Akkadian: — ='water' ='deep', recorded in Greek as  ), is the name for fresh water from underground aquifers which was given a religious fertilising quality in Sumerian and Akkadian mythology. Lakes, springs, rivers, wells, and other sources of fresh water were thought to draw their water from the abzu. In Sumerian and Akkadian mythology, it is referred to as the primeval sea below the void space of the underworld (Kur) and the earth (Ma) above.

In Sumerian culture 
In the city of Eridu, Enki's temple was known as E2-abzu (house of the deep waters) and was located at the edge of a swamp, an abzu.  Certain tanks of holy water in Babylonian and Assyrian temple courtyards were also called abzu (apsû).  Typical in religious washing, these tanks were similar to Judaism's mikvot, the washing pools of Islamic mosques, or the baptismal font in Christian churches.

In Sumerian cosmology 
The Sumerian god Enki (Ea in the Akkadian language) was believed to have lived in the abzu since before human beings were created.  His wife Damgalnuna, his mother Nammu, his advisor Isimud and a variety of subservient creatures, such as the gatekeeper Lahmu, also lived in the abzu.

As a deity
In this story, he was a primal being made of fresh water and a lover to another primal deity, Tiamat, a creature of salt water. The  begins: "When above the heavens (e-nu-ma e-liš) did not yet exist nor the earth below, Apsu the freshwater ocean was there, the first, the begetter, and Tiamat, the saltwater sea, she who bore them all; they were still mixing their waters, and no pasture land had yet been formed, nor even a reed marsh." This resulted in the birth of the younger gods, who later murdered Apsu in order to usurp his lordship of the universe. Enraged, Tiamat gives birth to the first dragons, filling their bodies with "venom instead of blood", and made war upon her treacherous children, only to be slain by Marduk, the god of Storms, who then forms the heavens and earth from her corpse.

In popular culture
Abzû is a 2016 adventure game that was influenced by Sumerian mythology of Abzu.

See also

Notes

External links 
 

Mesopotamian gods
Sea and river gods
Creator gods
Sumer
Snake gods
Tiamat
Characters in the Enūma Eliš
Killed deities